Discography of Five Star (also styled as 5 Star), a British pop/R&B group formed in 1983.

Between 1985 and 1988, Five Star had four top 20 albums and 15 Top 40 singles in the UK, including top 10 hits "System Addict", "Can't Wait Another Minute", "Find the Time", and "Rain or Shine". The group have additionally had two studio albums and four singles chart in the US while also scoring chart success across Europe and in New Zealand.

Albums

Studio albums

Compilation albums

Singles

Music videos

Videos and DVDs

References

External links
Five Star official website

Discographies of British artists
Pop music group discographies